Chrysina gloriosa is a species of scarab whose common names are glorious beetle and glorious scarab. These iridescent stripes on the cuticle of the elytra are a result of cholesteric liquid crystal organization of chitin molecules. The differences in color are a result of the microscopic structure of each section, with green reflected from cusp-like structures and silver reflected from flat layers parallel to the surface of the elytra. As established through Mueller matrix spectroscopic ellipsometry, the optical properties change with the incidence angle of the propagating light. The polygonal cells in the green stripes generate self-healing Bessel beams. The adults eat juniper leaves at a high elevation and are able to camouflage by blending in with plants. The species is sometimes incorrectly thought to be endangered, but has never been listed either in the IUCN Red List of Threatened Species or under the United States Endangered Species Act. An invalid synonym used to be Plusiotis gloriosa.

References

Rutelinae
Beetles of North America
Beetles described in 1854